The Shadow of Evil is a 1921 British silent crime film directed by George A. Cooper and James Reardon and starring Mary Dibley, Reginald Fox and Cecil Humphreys.

Cast
 Mary Dibley 
 Reginald Fox 
 Cecil Humphreys 
 Gladys Mason

References

Bibliography
 Murphy, Robert. Directors in British and Irish Cinema: A Reference Companion. British Film Institute, 2006.

External links

1921 films
1921 crime films
British silent feature films
British crime films
Films directed by George A. Cooper
British black-and-white films
1920s English-language films
1920s British films